People Hear What They See is a studio album by American hip hop artist Oddisee. It was released via Mello Music Group on June 5, 2012.

Critical reception

Andrew Noz of Washington City Paper gave the album a mixed review, saying, "Sometimes he gets buried in the ornateness of his own beats; elsewhere, he manages to compensate with the instinctive understanding of having created them." Meanwhile, Marcus J. Moore of BBC Music commented that "With this album, Oddisee looks in the mirror and examines his own intricacies, attempting to comprehend his immediate surroundings and society as a whole." Jesse Fairfax of HipHopDX gave the album 4 stars out of 5, saying, "Technically still a product of Hip Hop as his long established penchant for fierce rapping accompanied by boom-bap rhythm is fully intact, his gradual growth towards a fleshed out vision inclusive of live instrumentation may seek transcendence that dispels confinement within a set genre." Brandon Soderberg of Spin called it "a gritty hip-hop album with detours into orchestrated soul, quiet storm, and space disco."

Homeboy Sandman named it his favorite album of 2012. Uproxx included it on the "12 Most Slept-On Albums of 2012" list. In 2014, Complex included it on the "Best One-Producer Albums of the 2000s" list.

Track listing

Personnel
Credits adapted from liner notes.

 Oddisee – vocals, production, arrangement, mixing
 Diamond District – vocals (2)
 Olivier Daysoul – vocals (3, 4, 6)
 Ralph Real – vocals (8), additional instrumentation
 Tranqill – vocals (9)
 Akhil Gopal – trumpet
 Leon Cotter – saxophone
 Brian Paulding – trombone
 Will Wells – tuba
 Alex Blum – viola
 Studio A – mastering
 Michael Tolle – executive production
 D237 – design
 Jenna Foxton – photography

Charts

References

Further reading

External links
 
 

2012 albums
Oddisee albums
Mello Music Group albums